Chavibetol is an organic chemical compound of the phenylpropanoid class. It is one of the primary constituents of the essential oil from the leaves of the betel plant (Piper betel) and catatia. It is an aromatic compound with a spicy odor.

Uses
 Decor, candle - Chemicals detected in substances or products (note that these chemicals may be absent from an 'ingredient list' for the product and thus unexpected, but have been detected in product testing studies) 
 Fragrance - Fragrances or odor agents, can be used in home products (cleaners, laundry products, air fresheners) or similar industrial products; usage indicated when known; more specific modifiers included when known.

See also 
Harmane
Harmaline

References 

Phenylpropenes
O-methylated phenylpropanoids
Allyl compounds
O-methylated natural phenols